A radioligand is a radioactive biochemical substance, in particular, a ligand that is radiolabeled. Radioligands are used for diagnosis or for research-oriented study of the receptor systems of the body, and for anti-cancer radioligand therapy.

In a neuroimaging application the radioligand is injected into the pertinent tissue, or infused into the bloodstream.  It binds to its receptor. When the radioactive isotope in the ligand decays it can be measured by positron emission tomography (PET) or single-photon emission computed tomography (SPECT). In in vivo systems it is often used to quantify the binding of a test molecule to the binding site of a radioligand. The higher the affinity of the molecule the more radioligand is displaced from the binding site and the increasing radioactive decay can be measured by scintillography. This assay is commonly used to calculate the binding constant of molecules to receptors.

The transport of the radioligand is described by receptor kinetics.

History 
Radioligands are credited with making possible the study of biomolecular behaviour, a previously mysterious area of research that had evaded researchers. With this capacity radioligand techniques enabled researchers to identify receptor devices within cells.

Radioactive isotopes commonly used 

 Tritium, 3H
 Carbon-14, 14C
 Sulfur-35, 35S
 Iodine-131, 131I
 Fluorine-18, 18F
 Technetium-99m, 99mTc
 Copper-64, 64Cu

In PET the isotopes fluorine-18, carbon-11, and copper-64 are often used in molecular imaging.

List of radioligands 

Radioligands may be constructed to bind selectively to a particular neuroreceptor or a particular neurotransmitter transporter. 
Examples of radioligands include: 
 11C-WAY-100635 for the 5-HT1A receptor
 N(1)-([11C]-methyl)-2-Br-LSD ([11C]-MBL) for 5-HT2 receptors 
 18F-altanserin and 18F-setoperone for the 5-HT2A receptor 
 11C-ketanserin and tritiated ketanserin
 11C-DASB for the serotonin transporter
 3H-WIN55,212-2 for cannabinoid receptors
[11C]flumazenil for GABAA receptors.
(+)PHNO for D2 dopamine receptors.
[11C]raclopride for D2 dopamine receptors.

See also 
 Binding potential
 Distribution volume
 PET radiotracer
 Radioactivity in biology

References

Further reading 
 

Biochemistry detection methods
Biomolecules
Receptors